Greyster is a type of dog that is bred in the mid 1980s in Norway through a series of crosses between the German Shorthaired Pointer and the Greyhound for the purpose of sled-pulling, skijøring, pulka races and other such sled racing. The Greyster gets its endurance and its enthusiasm from the German Shorthaired Pointer and its speed from the Greyhound, making it very well-suited for skijøring competitions and other similar sports.

Greysters have been bred for speed and endurance in winter conditions.

See also
 Eurohound
 Crossbreed
 Dogsled racing
 Sled dog
 German Shorthaired Pointer

References

Sled dogs
Dog breeds originating in Europe
Dog breeds originating in Norway